John Rewald (May 12, 1912 – February 2, 1994) was an American academic, author and art historian.  He was known as a scholar of Impressionism, Post-Impressionism, Cézanne, Renoir, Pissarro, Seurat, and other French painters of the late 19th century. He was recognized as a foremost authority on late 19th-century art.  His History of Impressionism is a standard work.

Biography

He was born Gustav Rewald at Berlin, of a middle-class, professional family.  Rewald came from a Jewish background.  He completed his Abitur in Hamburg, and studied thereafter at several German universities, going to the Sorbonne in Paris in 1932. At the Sorbonne he wrote his dissertation on the friendship of Zola and Cézanne, having to persuade the academic authorities on this because Cézanne (died 1906) was considered too recent a figure. 

When France declared war on Germany in 1939, he was interned as an enemy alien.  He emigrated to the United States in 1941 and Alfred Barr, director of the New York Museum of Modern Art, was his sponsor.  From 1943 on, he consulted for the Museum of Modern Art, organizing exhibitions for it and other museums and researching his magnum opus, a history of Impressionism. The History of Impressionism was published in 1946 to universal acclaim.

Rewald was a visiting professor at Princeton University between 1961 and 1964.  He joined the faculty of the University of Chicago in 1964 and remained there till 1971.  In that year he received an appointment as 'distinguished professor of art history' at the City University of New York (CUNY). 1977 saw him organizing the major 'Cézanne: The Late Work' exhibition at MoMA with William Rubin.  He spent the year 1979 as the A. W. Mellon Lecturer at the National Gallery of Art in Washington and retired from CUNY in 1984.

A devoted Cézanne scholar, he was instrumental in creating a foundation to save Cézanne's studio and turn it into a museum. It is now a permanent museum in Aix-en-Provence, L'atelier Cézanne, and can be viewed as it was at the painter's death.  The citizens of Aix, in gratitude to Rewald, named a plaza after him.

Rewald died of congestive heart failure at age 81. He is buried close to Cézanne, at Aix-en-Provence cemetery.

Rewald's Significance
Rewald, a highly cultured and erudite man and a renowned writer, was the product of four distinct civilizations: the pre-World War I Wilhelmine German Empire, the Weimar Republic of Germany, the French Third Republic in its final years, and America in the latter half of the 20th century. He is famous not only for his solid scholarship, and the ground-breaking treatment of his subject, but also for the beauty and lucidity of his prose which, invariably sober and scholarly, never departing from the factual, rises at times to a culminating lyricism.

In 1983, Theodore Reff, Professor of Art History at Columbia University commented: "He is more responsible than anyone else for putting the study of Impressionism and Post-Impressionism on solid scholarly foundations. What he set out to do, he did more thoroughly and scrupulously than anybody else, and he did it first."

Complementing his career as an academic, he served as one of the founding members of the board of directors of the International Foundation for Art Research.

Selected works
In a statistical overview derived from writings by and about John Rewald, OCLC/WorldCat encompasses roughly 600+ works in 1,400+ publications in 24 languages and 33,000+ library holdings.

 Cézanne et Zola (1936)
 Maillol (1939)
 Georges Seurat (1943)
 History of Impressionism (1946)
 Paul Cézanne (1948)
 Pierre Bonnard (1948)
 Les Fauves (1952)
 History of Post-Impressionism: From van Gogh to Gauguin (1956)
 Studies in Impressionism (1986)
 Studies in Post-Impressionism (1986)
 Cézanne, a Biography (1986)
 Seurat, a Biography (1990)
 Camille Pissarro (1963)
 The Impressionist Brush (1973/74)
 Cézanne, the Steins, and their Circle (1987)
 Cézanne in America (1989)

Edited works
 Paul Cézanne, Letters (1941)
 Paul Gauguin, Letters (1943)
 Camille Pissarro, Letters to his Son Lucien (1943)
 The Woodcuts of Aristide Maillol (1943), catalogue raisonné
 Renoir, Drawings (1946)
 Paul Cézanne, Carnets de Dessins (1951)
 The Sculptures of Edgar Degas (1957), catalogue raisonné
 Gauguin, Drawings (1958)

Notes

References
 "Rewald, John." (1993) The Columbia Encyclopedia, 5th Edition. New York: Columbia University Press.
  "Rewald, John ...," Dictionary of Art Historians.

1912 births
1994 deaths
American people of German-Jewish descent
German emigrants to the United States
University of Paris alumni
Princeton University faculty
University of Chicago faculty
City University of New York faculty
American art historians
German art historians
20th-century American historians
German male non-fiction writers
20th-century American male writers
American male non-fiction writers